Andrei Olhovskiy was the defending champion, but lost in the quarterfinals to Daniel Vacek.

Yevgeny Kafelnikov won the title by defeating Daniel Vacek 6–3, 7–5 in the final.

Seeds

Draw

Finals

Top half

Bottom half

References

External links
 Official results archive (ATP)
 Official results archive (ITF)

1994 Copenhagen Open – 1
1994 ATP Tour